Richard E. Dickerson (born 1931) is an American biochemist. He was the first to carry out a single-crystal structure analysis of B-DNA, with what has become known as the "Dickerson dodecamer": C-G-C-G-A-A-T-T-C-G-C-G. At UCLA he has continued his investigations of the structures of A- and B-DNA, and of complexes between DNA and drugs or proteins. He was elected to the National Academy of Sciences and American Academy of Arts and Sciences in 1985. During the academic year 1997-1998, Dickerson was the Newton-Abraham Visiting Professor in Medical, Biological and Chemical Science at Lincoln College and the Laboratory of Molecular Biophysics at Oxford University.

Since 2013, Dickerson has been listed on the Advisory Council of the National Center for Science Education.

Education 
 B.S. in chemistry from Carnegie Institute of Technology in 1953.
 Ph.D. in physical chemistry in 1957 at the University of Minnesota, studying the structures of boron hydrides under the direction of future Nobel Laureate Professor William N. Lipscomb.
 Postdoc for two years at the University of Cambridge with John C. Kendrew.

Appointments and positions held
 Professor Emeritus, Department of Chemistry and Biochemistry, UCLA, USA

References

External links 
 Dickerson research lab at UCLA

1931 births
Living people
American biochemists
Carnegie Mellon University alumni
University of Minnesota College of Science and Engineering alumni
Members of the United States National Academy of Sciences